The Cyprus women's national basketball team represents Cyprus in international women's basketball competitions. The team is administered by the Cyprus Basketball Federation. The Cyprus women's national team has appeared at the FIBA Women's European Championship for Small Countries nine times overall.

See also
 Cyprus women's national under-18 basketball team
 Cyprus women's national under-16 basketball team

References

External links
Official website 
Cyprus at FIBA site
Cyprus National Team - Women at Eurobasket.com

Women's national basketball teams
Basketball in Cyprus
Basketball teams in Cyprus
Basketball